Bedingfield is an English surname. Notable people with the surname include:

Daniel Bedingfield (born 1979), New Zealand-born British pop singer-songwriter
Edmund Bedingfield (1479–1553)
Frank Bedingfield (1877–1904), English footballer with Aston Villa, Queens Park Rangers and Portsmouth in the 1890s and 1900s
Gary Bedingfield (born 1963), British-born baseball historian
Glenn Bedingfield (born 1974), Maltese politician
Henry Bedingfield (disambiguation)
Margery Beddingfield (1742–1763), British criminal
Eric Bedingfield (born 1967), American politician
Natasha Bedingfield (born 1981), British pop singer
Nikola Bedingfield (born 1983), British pop singer
Oriana Bedingfield (born 1984), Maltese footballer

English toponymic surnames